General elections were held in Saint Vincent and the Grenadines on 15 June 1998. Although the Unity Labour Party (ULP) received a majority of the public vote, the New Democratic Party (NDP) won a majority of seats, the first time the party receiving a majority of the vote had failed to win the elections since 1966. Voter turnout was 67.4%.

Campaign
The ruling NDP led by Prime Minister James Mitchell was opposed by the ULP headed by Vincent Beache; the ULP had been founded in 1994 by a merger of the Movement for National Unity (MNU) and the Saint Vincent Labour Party. The election date had been announced on 18 May.

During the campaign, the NDP advocated tax cuts and the promotion of tourism and agricultural development, while the ULP called for job creation, economic development and improved social services.

Results
When polling results giving the NDP eight seats and the ULP seven seats were announced, Beache declared that he could not accept the outcome and called for fresh elections, alleging voter intimidation, fraud, and bribery; this was promptly rebutted by the NDP. Final results showed the ULP had received 54.6% of valid votes.

By constituency

Aftermath
On 17 June Mitchell was sworn in for his fourth consecutive term as Prime Minister; his new Cabinet took office the next day. In December 1998 Beache resigned as leader of the ULP, and Ralph Gonsalves was elected in his place. However, Beache remained as leader of the opposition in the House of Assembly.

References

Saint Vincent
Elections in Saint Vincent and the Grenadines
1998 in Saint Vincent and the Grenadines